Gretna railway station was a railway station close to Gretna Green in Scotland. The Caledonian Railway, however, built the station just south of Gretna Junction and the England/Scotland border, in Cumberland (now Cumbria).

History 
The station opened on 9 September 1847. It closed on 10 September 1951.

Very little remains of the station in 2008.

The Caledonian Railway station was one of three serving Gretna, the others being:
 Gretna built by Glasgow, Dumfries and Carlisle Railway in 1848 (successor station open)
 Gretna built by the Border Union Railway in 1861, closing in 1915.

A short distance to the north on the Caledonian Railway are Quintinshill loops, the site of the rail crash in 1915.

References

Notes

Sources 
 
 
 
 Gretna (Caledonian) railway station on navigable OS map

Disused railway stations in Cumbria
Former Caledonian Railway stations
Railway stations in Great Britain opened in 1847
Railway stations in Great Britain closed in 1951
1847 establishments in Scotland